Douglas de Almeida Caé da Conceição (born 24 October 1987) is a Brazilian professional footballer who plays as a striker for Real Estelí.

References

1987 births
Living people
Brazilian footballers
Fluminense de Feira Futebol Clube players
Central Sport Club players
Santos Futebol Clube (AP) players
Clube Atlético Joseense players
Walter Ormeño de Cañete players
Madureira Esporte Clube players
Resende Futebol Clube players
Associação Atlética Portuguesa (RJ) players
Al Jeel Club players
Vaasan Palloseura players
Peruvian Segunda División players
Veikkausliiga players
Saudi First Division League players
Association football forwards
Brazilian expatriate footballers
Brazilian expatriate sportspeople in Peru
Expatriate footballers in Peru
Brazilian expatriate sportspeople in Finland
Expatriate footballers in Finland
Brazilian expatriate sportspeople in Saudi Arabia
Expatriate footballers in Saudi Arabia
Real Estelí F.C. players
Brazilian expatriates in Nicaragua
Expatriate footballers in Nicaragua
Nicaraguan Primera División players